The 2018 Newcastle City Council elections took place on 3 May 2018, on the same day as other local elections across the United Kingdom.

For the first time since 2004, boundary changes occurred across Newcastle upon Tyne and the entire council was up for re-election. In June 2016, the Boundary Commission published draft proposals of potential new ward boundaries, with significant changes throughout the entirety of the city, though with some wards remaining the same.

The Conservative Party candidate for the Manor Park ward, Florence Kirkby, is 96 years old and is believed to be one of the oldest people to stand in the United Kingdom in an election.

Result

Council Composition
Prior to the election, the composition of the council was: 

After the election, the composition of the council is:

Ward Results

Arthur's Hill

Benwell and Scotswood

Blakelaw

Byker

Callerton and Throckley

Castle

Chapel

Dene and South Gosforth

Denton and Westerhope

Elswick

Fawdon and West Gosforth

Gosforth

Heaton

Kenton

Kingston Park South and Newbiggin Hall

Lemington

Manor Park

Monument

North Jesmond

Ouseburn

a Nicholas Sundin was suspended by the Conservative Party due to a series of Islamophobic social media posts and offensive comments he has made about Hillsborough survivors. He remained on the ballot as a Conservative candidate, but would have sat as an independent had he won. He stood in a ward in Gateshead in 2015 for UKIP.

Parklands

South Jesmond

Walker

Walkergate

West Fenham

Wingrove

References

2018 English local elections
2018